Skylar Justin Mays (born September 5, 1997) is an American professional basketball player for the Capitanes de Ciudad de México of the NBA G League. He played college basketball for the LSU Tigers.

Early life and high school career
Mays grew up in Baton Rouge, Louisiana and attended the Louisiana State University Laboratory School (U-High), where he began playing on the varsity basketball team when he in eighth grade. He first began to dunk the basketball as a freshman. He was named first-team All-State in his sophomore and junior seasons as he helped lead the Cubs to back to back state championships. As a junior, he averaged 9.1 points, 8.1 assists and 3.2 rebounds. Mays transferred to Findlay Prep in Henderson, Nevada before his senior year and averaged 10.9 points, 5.3 assists, 3.0 rebounds and 2.7 steals in his only season with the Pilots. Rated a three-star recruit, Mays committed to play college basketball at Louisiana State during his sophomore year before re-opening his recruitment to other schools shortly before he transferred to Findlay. Mays eventually re-committed to LSU after considering offers from Baylor, UNLV, Oklahoma State, Memphis, California and Stanford.

College career
Mays became the Tigers' starting point guard during his freshman year, averaging 8.3 points, 2.2 rebounds, 3.6 assists and 1.3 steals over 31 games (25 starts). As a sophomore, Mays averaged 11.3 points, 4.0 rebounds and 3.0 assists as well as 1.6 steals per game. He averaged 13.4 points, 3.3 rebounds 2.1 assists and 1.9 steals per game as a junior and was named second team All-Southeastern Conference (SEC) and the conference's scholar-athlete of the year. Mays scored his 1,000th career point on February 26, 2019 against Texas A&M. After the season, Mays declared for the 2019 NBA draft but ultimately opted to return to LSU.

Mays was named preseason first team All-SEC and to the watchlists for the Jerry West and the Naismith Player of the Year awards. He was also named the 45th-best collegiate basketball player going into the 2019–20 season by CBS Sports. Mays scored a career-high 30 points on November 22, 2019 in an 80–78 loss to Utah State. Mays tied his career high with 30 points along with eight assists and seven rebounds on February 8, 2020 in a 91–90 overtime loss to Auburn. At the end of the regular season he was again named a first team Academic All-American and was selected as the Academic All-American of the Year as well as First Team All-SEC and was named the scholar-athlete of the year for a second straight season. Mays averaged 16.7 points and 5.0 rebounds per game.

Professional career

Atlanta Hawks (2020–2022)
On November 18, 2020, Mays was selected with the 50th pick in the 2020 NBA draft by the Atlanta Hawks. Mays signed a two-way contract with the team on November 24, 2020, meaning he would split time between the Hawks and their NBA G League affiliate, the College Park Skyhawks. On February 13, Mays scored a career high 20 points against the San Antonio Spurs, cutting a 45-point deficit to just 11 in the second half.

Mays played for the Hawks in the 2021 NBA summer league, scoring 13 points in 30 minutes on 4-11 shooting at his debut in a 85-83 loss against the Boston Celtics. On August 26, 2021, Mays signed a second two-way contract with the Hawks. On April 7, 2022, the Hawks converted his previously signed two-way contract into a standard NBA contract.

Delaware Blue Coats (2022–2023)
On November 4, 2022, Mays was named to the opening night roster for the Delaware Blue Coats.

Capitanes de Ciudad de México (2023–present)
On February 4, 2023, Mays was traded along with Justin Robinson and Raphiael Putney to the Capitanes de Ciudad de México in exchange for Jahlil Okafor, Shabazz Napier, Bruno Caboclo, and Matt Mooney.

Career statistics

NBA

Regular season

|-
| style="text-align:left;"| 
| style="text-align:left;"| Atlanta
| 33 || 0 || 8.2 || .449 || .350 || .880 || 1.1 || .9 || .4 || .1 || 3.8
|-
| style="text-align:left;"| 
| style="text-align:left;"| Atlanta
| 28 || 5 || 7.9 || .500 || .320 || .889 || .9 || .6 || .3 || .0 || 2.9
|- class="sortbottom"
| style="text-align:center;" colspan="2"|Career
| 61 || 5 || 8.0 || .469 || .338 || .882 || 1.0 || .8 || .3 || .0 || 3.3

Playoffs

|-
| style="text-align:left;"| 2021
| style="text-align:left;"| Atlanta
| 7 || 0 || 2.4 || .800 || — || — || .3 || .1 || .3 || .0 || 1.1
|-
| style="text-align:left;"| 2022
| style="text-align:left;"| Atlanta
| 2 || 0 || 4.5 || 1.000 || — || — || .5 || .5 || .5 || .0 || 1.0
|- class="sortbottom"
| style="text-align:center;" colspan="2"|Career
| 9 || 0 || 2.9 || .833 || — || — || .3 || .2 || .3 || .0 || 1.1

College

|-
| style="text-align:left;"| 2016–17
| style="text-align:left;"| LSU
| 31 || 25 || 22.9 || .411 || .328 || .812 || 2.2 || 3.6 || 1.3 || .1 || 8.3
|-
| style="text-align:left;"| 2017–18
| style="text-align:left;"| LSU
| 33 || 30 || 31.1 || .443 || .351 || .837 || 4.0 || 2.9 || 1.6 || .2 || 11.3
|-
| style="text-align:left;"| 2018–19
| style="text-align:left;"| LSU
| 35 || 35 || 33.1 || .421 || .313 || .860 || 3.3 || 2.1 || 1.9 || .2 || 13.4
|-
| style="text-align:left;"| 2019–20
| style="text-align:left;"| LSU
| 31 || 31 || 34.4 || .491 || .394 || .854 || 5.0 || 3.2 || 1.8 || .2 || 16.7
|- class="sortbottom"
| style="text-align:center;" colspan="2"| Career
| 130 || 121 || 30.5 || .445 || .345 || .845 || 3.6 || 2.9 || 1.6 || .2 || 12.4

Personal life
Mays' best friend and LSU teammate, Wayde Sims, was killed by a gunshot wound to the head and neck on September 28, 2018. Mays served as the pallbearer at the funeral. He gave an 11-minute speech in Sims's honor at an on-campus vigil outside the Pete Maravich Assembly Center in front of a crowd of hundreds. Mays wore customized Nike tennis shoes during the 2019 SEC Tournament in honor of Sims.

References

External links
LSU Tigers bio

1997 births
Living people
American expatriate basketball people in Mexico
American men's basketball players
Atlanta Hawks draft picks
Atlanta Hawks players
Basketball players from Baton Rouge, Louisiana
Capitanes de Ciudad de México players
College Park Skyhawks players
Delaware Blue Coats players
Findlay Prep alumni
Louisiana State University Laboratory School alumni
LSU Tigers basketball players
Point guards
Shooting guards